Xenopus victorianus, the Lake Victoria clawed frog or Mwanza frog, is a species of frogs in the family Pipidae. It is found in aquatic habitats in eastern Democratic Republic of Congo and South Sudan, Uganda, Kenya, Rwanda, Burundi, and Tanzania. However, because of confusion with Xenopus laevis, the exact distribution is quite unclear.

Xenopus victorianus occurs in all sorts of aquatic habitats, except that it tends to avoid large rivers and waterbodies with predatory fish. It is most abundant in eutrophic water. It breeds in water, but apparently only in standing water. It is an opportunistic species that has high potential to colonize newly created bodies of water. It is a very abundant and adaptable species that is not facing major threats.

References

External links
 Photo from Semuliki National Park web site

victorianus
Frogs of Africa
Amphibians of Burundi
Amphibians of the Democratic Republic of the Congo
Amphibians of Kenya
Amphibians of Rwanda
Vertebrates of South Sudan
Amphibians of Tanzania
Amphibians of Uganda
Taxa named by Ernst Ahl
Amphibians described in 1924